The Dolynske Rural Council (officially, Dolynske Village Council) is one of 16 rural local government areas of the Zaporizhia Raion (district) of Zaporizhia Oblast in southern Ukraine. Its population was 2,815 in the 2001 Ukrainian Census.

It was established by the Verkhovna Rada, Ukraine's parliament, on 23 March 1995. The council's administrative center is located in the village of Dolynske.

Government
The council's local government council consists of 20 locally elected deputies. The council is represented by the No.82 single-mandate constituency for parliamentary elections in Ukraine.

Populated settlements
The Dolynske Rural Council's jurisdiction consists of five villages: 
 Baburka (pop. 362)
 Dolynske (pop. 690)
 Khortytsia
 Nove Zaporizhia (pop. 771)
 Novoslobidka (pop. 548)

In addition, the two rural settlements of Kantserivka (pop. 193) and Vysokohirne (pop. 251) fall under the councils jurisdiction.

The village of Khortytsia is the council's newest populated settlement, having been established by the Ukrainian parliament on 18 December 2008.

References

Zaporizhzhia Raion
States and territories established in 1995
1995 establishments in Ukraine